Gardner Edward Dickinson, Jr. (September 14, 1927 – April 19, 1998) was an American professional golfer.

Born in Dothan, Alabama, Dickinson was a student of Ben Hogan and crafted his swing in the Hogan tradition. He played college golf at Louisiana State, where he and teammate Jay Hebert led the Tigers to the national title in 1947. In a long PGA Tour career, he won seven times between 1956 and 1971. In his last win, the 1971 Atlanta Classic, he beat Jack Nicklaus in a sudden-death playoff.

During his PGA Tour career, Dickinson competed in 12 Masters Championships. His best finish came in 1973, when he tied for tenth. He played on the 1967 and 1971 Ryder Cup teams. With a 9–1–0 match record, Dickinson holds the record for best winning percentage (minimum of seven matches). In team Ryder Cup play, he never lost a match with partner Arnold Palmer (5–0).

Dickinson was one of the founders of the Senior PGA Tour (now Champions Tour). He authored the book Let 'er Rip — a lengthy, bitey rant in which he opines on everything from golf officials and his fellow players to topical issues such as how young people dress. He also designed the 36-hole Frenchman's Creek Club in Palm Beach, Florida. 

Dickinson later taught the game to players such as LPGA great JoAnne Carner and his future wife Judy Clark, who is a former player and president of the LPGA Tour.

After a long illness, he died at age 70 in Tequesta, Florida in 1998. Dickinson was voted into the Palm Beach County Sports Hall of Fame in 2004.

A well-known quote by Dickinson is: "They say golf is like life, but don't believe them. Golf is more complicated than that."

Professional wins (11)

PGA Tour wins (7)

PGA Tour playoff record (1–2)

Other wins (4)
1952 Florida Open
1956 West Palm Beach Open
1965 Haig & Haig Scotch Foursome (with Ruth Jessen)
1978 Legends of Golf (with Sam Snead)

Results in major championships

WD = withdrew
CUT = missed the half-way cut (3rd round cut in 1969 Open Championship)
"T" indicates a tie for a place

Summary

Most consecutive cuts made – 10 (1964 PGA – 1968 Masters)
Longest streak of top-10s – 1 (four times)

See also
List of golfers with most PGA Tour wins

References

External links

American male golfers
LSU Tigers golfers
PGA Tour golfers
PGA Tour Champions golfers
Ryder Cup competitors for the United States
Golfers from Alabama
Golfers from Florida
Sportspeople from Dothan, Alabama
People from Tequesta, Florida
1927 births
1998 deaths